Paul Marion (September 12, 1915 in The Bronx – September 8, 2011) was an American actor, notable for roles in To Have and Have Not (1944), Mysterious Doctor Satan and Captain Midnight.

Biography 
In 1941, Marion married actress Isabel Jewell. They were divorced on May 12, 1944. In 1952, he married Elinor Brand, and they divorced in 1984. They had four children. He acted on film from the late 1930s to 1955's Devil Goddess, when he left acting to become an agent.

Death
On September 8, 2011, Marion died in Los Angeles, California, at age 95.

Selected filmography

References

External links

Biography

1915 births
2011 deaths
American male film actors
Male actors from New York City
People from the Bronx